James E. C. Perry (born 1944) is a retired Justice of the Florida Supreme Court.  He was appointed by Governor Charlie Crist in March 2009 to replace retiring Justice Charles T. Wells and was Crist's fourth appointment to the Supreme Court.

"Throughout his career as an attorney and circuit judge, Justice Perry has demonstrated an extraordinary commitment to justice and equality," said Governor Crist at the time of appointment. "His expertise, professionalism and humanitarian spirit make him exceptionally qualified to serve on Florida's highest court."

Justice Perry is known for his work with youth.  He was founder and president of the Jackie Robinson Sports Association, a baseball league serving 650 at-risk girls and boys.  He trained his coaches not only to teach baseball but also required them to serve as mentors and tutors.

Before joining the state's highest court, Perry served as a circuit judge of Florida's Eighteenth Judicial Circuit following his appointment by Governor Jeb Bush in March 2000. He later served as Chief Judge of the Circuit for a two-year term beginning July 2003.

Perry attended St. Augustine's College, graduating in 1966 with a Bachelor of Arts in Business Administration and Accounting. After serving in the U.S. Army as a first lieutenant, he went on to Columbia Law School where he earned his Juris Doctor degree in 1972.

Justice Perry was the first African-American appointed to the Eighteenth Judicial Circuit. Governor Jeb Bush issued this statement when he appointed Justice Perry to the circuit bench in March 2000:

"James brings a high level of professionalism, knowledge, and skill to the bench. His community service and commitment to the Jackie Robinson Little League demonstrates his dedication to the community. I am confident that his expertise, strong commitment, and dedication will continue to be an asset to the 18th Judicial Circuit and the state."

Following his appointment to the circuit court bench, Justice Perry ran unopposed to retain his seat.

Justice Perry is the 85th Justice to take office at the Florida Supreme Court since statehood was granted in 1845.

Perry was barred from running for retention in 2016 due to the State Constitution's mandatory retirement age restrictions and was due to leave office on January 3, 2017, at the end of his current term. However, on September 12, 2016, Perry notified Governor Rick Scott of his intention to retire on December 30, 2016. He was succeeded on December 31, 2016, by Justice C. Alan Lawson.

See also
List of African-American jurists

References

Sources
The Florida Bar News, "Perry joins the court," April 1, 2009, p. 1.

External links

 Florida Supreme Court Profile
 Governor Crist's Press Release
 Columbia Law School Alumni Article

1944 births
Living people
African-American judges
Columbia Law School alumni
Justices of the Florida Supreme Court
Politicians from New Bern, North Carolina
St. Augustine's University (North Carolina) alumni
21st-century American judges